Dans Run is an unincorporated community in Mineral County, West Virginia, United States. It is part of the Cumberland, MD-WV Metropolitan Statistical Area. Dans Run is located along the former Baltimore and Ohio Railroad (now CSX) at the confluence of Dans Run and the North Branch Potomac River.

References 

Baltimore and Ohio Railroad
Unincorporated communities in Mineral County, West Virginia
Unincorporated communities in West Virginia
Populated places on the North Branch Potomac River